Judit Forgács (born 25 May 1959 in Budapest) is a Hungarian former sprinter who specialised in the 400 metres. She won bronze medals at the 1987 World Indoor Championships and 1990 European Indoor Championships. In addition she competed at the 1980 and 1992 Summer Olympics.

International competitions

1Representing Europe

Personal bests
Outdoor
100 metres – 11.95 (Budapest 1983)
200 metres – 23.46 (Sofia 1983)
400 metres – 51.55 (Budapest 1983)
Indoor
60 metres – 7.54 (Budapest 1984)
200 metres – 23.78 (Budapest 1987)
400 metres – 52.29 (Budapest 1987)

References

All-Athletics profile

1959 births
Living people
Athletes from Budapest
Hungarian female sprinters
Olympic athletes of Hungary
Athletes (track and field) at the 1980 Summer Olympics
Athletes (track and field) at the 1992 Summer Olympics
World Athletics Indoor Championships medalists
Olympic female sprinters